The 2011 Global Champions Tour was the 6th staging of the Global Champions Tour (GCT), an important international show jumping competition series. The series was held mainly in Europe, three competitions was held outside of Europe. All competitions was endowed at least 285000 €. All GCT events was held as CSI 5*.

The competitions was held between March 17, 2011 and November 12, 2011. There was no final. At the end of the season the best 18 riders in the final overall standings had got a bonus prize money.

Competitions 
All competitions was held as competition over two rounds against the clock with one jump-off against the clock.

1st Competition: Global Champions Tour of Qatar 
March 17, 2011 to March 19, 2011 – Qatar Racing & Equestrian Club, Doha, 
Competition: Saturday, March 19, 2011 – Start: 6:45 pm, prize money: € 475,000

(Top 3 of 47 competitors)

2nd Competition: Global Champions Tour of Spain 
May 6, 2011 to May 8, 2011 – Museo de las Ciencias Príncipe Felipe, Ciutat de les Arts i les Ciències, Valencia, 
Competition: Saturday, May 7, 2011 – Start: 5:00 pm, prize money: € 285,000

(Top 3 of 49 competitors)

3rd Competition: Global Champions Tour of Germany 

June 2, 2011 to June 5, 2011 – Hamburg (German show jumping and dressage derby), 
Competition: Saturday, June 4, 2011 – Start: 1:40 pm, prize money: € 285,000

(Top 3 of 49 competitors)

4th Competition: France I 
June 9, 2011 to June 11, 2011 – Cannes, 
Competition: Saturday, June 11, 2011 – Start: 6:00 pm, prize money: € 285,000

(Top 3 of 47 competitors)

5th Competition: Global Champions Tour of Monaco 
June 23, 2011 to June 25, 2011 – shore at the marina „Port Hercule“, Monte Carlo, 
Competition: Saturday, June 25, 2011 – Start: 6:00 pm, prize money: € 285,000

Course designer of the competition was fourth time in 2011 season Frank Rothenberger. The Monaco horse show was held on a provisional sand jumping arena at the shore of the Boulevard Albert 1er.

In the first round of the competition 12 riders had not faults. The second round was much more difficult, only three riders with her horses are clear in this round. Only Rolf-Göran Bengtsson was clear in both round, so he won the competition without a jump-off.

Charlotte Casiraghi was honorary president of the Monaco horse show. The congratulations at the prize giving ceremony of the Global Champions Tour competition was given by Albert II, Prince of Monaco.
 

(Top 3 of 47 competitors)

6th Competition: Global Champions Tour of Portugal 
June 30, 2011 to July 2, 2011 – Hipódromo Manuel Possolo, Cascais near Estoril, 
Competition: Saturday, July 2, 2011

Frank Rothenberger was again the course designer of the competition. In the first round nine riders had not faults. The second round are no problem for most of the now 18 riders, more than the half of them had not faults. In total six riders are faultless in both rounds – they was qualified for the jump-off.

In the jump-off the half of the six riders had no faults, Christian Ahlmann won the competition. The second round and the jump-off were held under floodlight.

(Top 3 of 45 competitors)

7th Competition: France II 
July 22, 2011 to July 24, 2011 – Chantilly Racecourse, Chantilly, 
Competition: Saturday, July 23, 2011 at 3:30 pm

Course designer at the GCT Grand Prix of Chantilly was Uliano Vezzani from Italy. Six riders with their horses had not faults in the first round. Also four riders had only time faults in this round. In the second round of the Grand Prix nine rider had not faults. In total three riders are faultless in both rounds – they was qualified for the jump-off.

(Top 3 of 46 competitors)

8th Competition: Global Champions Tour of the Netherlands 
August 12, 2011 to August 14, 2011 – Valkenswaard, 
Competition: Saturday, August 13, 2011

Second time in this GCT season Uliano Vezzani was the course designer of a GCT Grand Prix. In the first round of this Grand Prix twelve riders had no penalty points. In the second round six riders with their horses had not faults. In total four riders are faultless in both rounds. This riders were qualified for the jump-off. Winner of the competition was US-American rider Beezie Madden.

{| class="wikitable" style="font-size: 90%"
|-
!rowspan=2 width=20|
!rowspan=2 width=210|Rider
!rowspan=2 width=110|Horse
!colspan=2|Round 1
!colspan=2|Round 2
!colspan=2|Jump-off
!rowspan=2 width=60|scoringpoints
|-
!width=75|Penalties!!width=75|Time(s)!!width=75|Penalties!!width=75|Time(s)!!width=75|Penalties!!width=75|Time(s)
|-
| align=center|1 ||  Beezie Madden || Cortes'C''' || align=center|0 || align=center|- || align=center|0 || align=center|- || align=center|0 || align=center|38.38 || align=center|40
|-
| align=center|2 ||  Denis Lynch || Lantinus || align=center|0 || align=center|- || align=center|0 || align=center|- || align=center|0 || align=center|38.92 || align=center|37
|-
| align=center|3 ||  Jur Vrieling || Bubalu || align=center|0 || align=center|- || align=center|0 || align=center|- || align=center|4 || align=center|39.52 || align=center|35
|}
(Top 3 of 49 competitors)

 9th Competition: Global Champions Tour of Brazil 
September 2, 2011 to September 4, 2011 – equestrian facility of the Sociedade Hípica Brasileira, Rio de Janeiro (Athina Onassis International Horse Show), 
Competition: Saturday, September 4, 2011 – Start: 4:00 pm

The Grand Prix of Rio de Janeiro is with a prize money of €1,000,000 the highest endowed show jumping Grand Prix in 2011 – in front of the Grand Prix of Calgary (with a purse of Can$1,000,000) and the Grand Prix of Saugerties (US$1,000,000 prize money). Course designer of this competition is Luc Musette from Belgium.

According to the prize money the course was built very sophisticated. In round one only two riders had no faults, five riders had retired in the show-jumping course. The second round was easier for the riders, ten of 18 riders with their horses had no faults. The only rider with a double clear round was Gerco Schröder with the Belgian stallion London, so a jump-off was not necessary.

(Top 3 of 38 competitors)

 10th Competition: Global Champions Tour of the United Arab Emirates 
November 24, 2011 to November 26, 2011 –  Al-Forsan International Sports Resort, Abu Dhabi, 
Competition: Saturday, November 26, 2011 – Start: 3:45 pm

First time ever a Global Champions Tour competition was held in the United Arab Emirates. The show jumping course was built again by Italian Uliano Vezzani. The competition had a purse of € 400,000.

In the first round 13 riders had no faults, three other riders had only time faults. Ludger Beerbaum, who had ridden Chaman'', had big problems in a triple combination and retired after eight penalties. After this ride it was clear that Edwina Tops-Alexander had won the 2011 Global Champions Tour ranking. But also Tops-Alexander had eight penalties, so she was not qualified for the second round of this competition.

In the second round elven of eighteen riders with their horses had no faults. Eight riders in total was clear in both rounds, they was qualified for the jump-off. The winner of the competition was French rider Roger-Yves Bost, who used as only rider of the jump-off a shortcut, so he had the fastest time in the jump-off.

(Top 3 of 38 competitors)

Final standings 

Seven results count for the final standing.

References 

Global Champions Tour
Global Champions Tour